Taylorina is a genus of bivalves on the subfamily Myrteinae, belonging to the family Lucinidae.

Distribution
This marine species occurs off the Philippines at depths between 1240 m and 1258 m.

Species
 Taylorina alata Cosel & Bouchet, 2008
 Taylorina makassar Cosel & Bouchet, 2008
 Taylorina manusutor Cosel & Bouchet, 2008
 Taylorina solomonensis Cosel & Bouchet, 2008

References

 Cosel R. von & Bouchet P. (2008). Tropical deep-water lucinids (Mollusca: Bivalvia) from the Indo-Pacific: essentially unknown, but diverse and occasionally gigantic. in: Héros V. et al. (eds), Tropical Deep-Sea Benthos volume 25. Mémoires du Muséum national d'Histoire naturelle. 196: 115-213.
 Glover E.A. & Taylor J.D. (2016). Lucinidae of the Philippines: highest known diversity and ubiquity of chemosymbiotic bivalves from intertidal to bathyal depths (Mollusca: Bivalvia). in: Héros V. et al. (eds) Tropical Deep-Sea Benthos 29. Mémoires du Muséum national d'Histoire naturelle. 208: 65-234
 Taylor J. & Glover E. (2021). Biology, evolution and generic review of the chemosymbiotic bivalve family Lucinidae. London: The Ray Society [Publication 182]. 319 pp.

Lucinidae
Bivalve genera